Tashlyk Pumped-Storage Power Plant is a pumped-storage power station near Yuzhnoukrainsk in Mykolaiv Oblast, Ukraine. It connects  with Oleksandrivska reservoir on the Southern Bug River.

The Tashlyk Hydraulic Accumulation Station is located west of the district center of Arbuzynka, three kilometers south of Yuzhnoukrainsk.

Info 

Tashlyk Pumped-Storage Power Plant is part of the South-Ukrainian Energy Complex, which includes the South Ukraine Nuclear Power Plant and Oleksandrivka hydroelectric power station. The pumped-storage plant is designed to cover peak loads in the southwestern part of the united power grid of Ukraine, and to provide a reliable baseline regime for the nuclear plant.

Construction of the station began in 1981. In the original plans, the Tashlyk HPSP was to consist of six rotary (generator / engine) units of 150 MW in a turbine mode / 225 in pumping mode and four conventional 250 MW units with a total installed capacity of 6 × 150 + 4 × 250 = 1900 MW (generator mode) / 6 × 225 = 1350 MW (motor mode). In the complex with the HPSS above the channel of the Southern Bug, the Kostyantynivska HPP was to be built, but the project was redeveloped after environmentalists protested.

By the order of the Cabinet of Ministers of July 27, 2006, the project provides only Tashlyk HPSP with installation of six units of 151 / 216.5 MW with a total capacity of 906 MW in turbine mode and 1299 MW in the pump.

The first hydropower unit of Tashlyk HPS was launched on September 14, 2006, in pumping (engine) mode and the gradual filling of the reservoir of the PSP began, and on October 16, 2006, it was started in the generator (turbine) mode. The second hydropower unit of Tashlyk HPS was launched on July 21, 2007, in the generator (turbine) mode, and July 24 in the engine (pumping mode).

The commissioning of the third hydroelectric unit was scheduled for 2011.

See also 
 Hydroelectricity in Ukraine

References

Sources 
 Ташлицькая ГАЕС
 Ташлицькая ГАЕС
 «Енергоатом» за 12 мільйонів проектує добудову Ташлицької ГАЕС, проти якої виступають екологи
 
 

Energy infrastructure completed in 1981
Energy infrastructure completed in 2007
Pumped-storage hydroelectric power stations in Ukraine
Hydroelectric power stations in Ukraine
Southern Bug